California Newspapers Partnership is a publisher of more than two dozen daily newspapers and several weekly newspapers in the United States state of California. The partnership is managed as a subsidiary of MediaNews Group, its majority owner. The minority partner is Stephens Media, with roughly a one-quarter ownership stake.

History 
William Dean Singleton, founder of MediaNews, pushed for the partnership in 1999 as part of his "clustering" strategy of newspaper ownership — owning groups of newspapers in a geographic area for economies of scale. For example, he had acquired five dailies in Northern California in the mid-1990s and centralized their operations into one copy and layout desk, and one team for special sections such as sports and features.

In an effort to achieve efficiencies on a larger scale, Singleton offered to pool its Bay Area papers — the Alamedia Newspaper Group — and the Los Angeles Daily News in a partnership with the Ontario, California, assets of Donrey Media Group (now called Stephens). A year after forming the partnership, the duo were joined by Gannett, which contributed the San Bernardino Sun and the Marin Independent Journal.

MediaNews entered into similar partnerships in New Mexico-Texas and Pennsylvania with Gannett, and in Colorado with E.W. Scripps Company. In 2015, Gannett gave its stake in CNP to MediaNews successor Digital First Media in exchange for the New Mexico-Texas and Pennsylvania and cash.

As MediaNews remains the largest shareholder in the California Newspaper Partnership, the partnership effectively functions as a subsidiary of Denver-based MediaNews Group, and a parent to MediaNews' three newspaper clusters in California, the Bay Area News Group, Los Angeles Newspaper Group and its Northern California holdings. Those operational clusters include a combination of newspapers owned by the partnership and newspapers wholly owned by MediaNews.

Holdings

Bay Area
CNP dailies in the Bay Area News Group:
Alameda Times-Star of Alameda, California
The Argus of Fremont, California
Contra Costa Times of Walnut Creek, California
The Daily News of Palo Alto, California
East County Times
Marin Independent Journal of San Rafael, California
San Jose Mercury News of San Jose, California
Santa Cruz Sentinel of Santa Cruz, California

Northern California
CNP dailies in Northern California:
Daily Democrat of Woodland, California
Daily News of Red Bluff, California
Enterprise Record of Chico, California
Lake County Record Bee of Lakeport, California
Oroville Mercury Register of Oroville, California
Times-Standard of Eureka, California
Ukiah Daily Journal of Ukiah, California
Vacaville Reporter of Vacaville, California
Vallejo Times Herald of Vallejo, California

Southern California
CNP dailies in the Southern California News Group:
Inland Valley Daily Bulletin of Rancho Cucamonga, California
Pasadena Star-News of Pasadena, California
Redlands Daily Facts of Redlands, California
San Gabriel Valley Tribune of Monrovia, California
The Sun of San Bernardino, California
Whittier Daily News of Whittier, California
Orange County Register of Anaheim, California
Riverside Press-Enterprise of Riverside, California
Los Angeles Daily News of Woodland Hills, California
Long Beach Press Telegram of Long Beach, California
Torrance Daily Breeze of Torrance, California

References

Gannett
MediaNews Group
Publishing companies established in 1999
1999 establishments in California
Companies based in Contra Costa County, California